Reichardtiella is a genus of moth in the family Gelechiidae. It contains the species Reichardtiella grisea, which is found in the Pamir Mountains.

References

Gelechiinae